Yorkville University is a private for-profit university established in 2003 in New Brunswick, Canada. The university accepted its first students in the fall of 2004 for the programs offered out of Fredericton, New Brunswick, which was at the time the only establishment under Yorkville University. The university has since launched a brick-and-mortar campus in Vancouver, British Columbia. and acquired 2 brick-and-mortar campuses in Toronto, Ontario. In 2018 Yorkville acquired the RCC Institute of Technology. This included 3 schools - Academy of Design, School of Engineering Technology & Computing and the Toronto Film School.

Academics
Yorkville University has been granted authority to offer degree programs in Ontario, British Columbia and New Brunswick, including Bachelor of Business Administration.

Campuses
Yorkville does not have a traditional campus. All four locations are in office or business park settings:

 Fredericton, New Brunswick - a two-storey building located at 100 Woodside Lane
Toronto, Ontario - Campus shares this location with the Toronto Film School at 460 Yonge Street
Concord, Ontario - Campus is located at the former RCC Institute of Technology and shared with the Toronto Film School at 2000 Steeles Avenue West
 Vancouver, British Columbia - 88 Sixth Street, Suite 300, New Westminster

Notable alumni 

 Molly Carlson, high diver

See also
For-profit education
Higher education in New Brunswick
List of universities and colleges in New Brunswick
RCC Institute of Technology

References

External links

 
Education in Fredericton
Universities in New Brunswick
Educational institutions established in 2003
2003 establishments in New Brunswick